Andrew Fleming is an American screenwriter, film director, television producer, television director, film producer, actor, and television writer. He directed and wrote or co-wrote the films Bad Dreams, Threesome, The Craft, Dick, Nancy Drew, Hamlet 2, Barefoot, and Ideal Home, and directed The In-Laws. He has also directed episodes of the television series Arrested Development and Grosse Pointe, among others.

He studied filmmaking at New York University film school.

Personal life
Fleming is gay, and based his 2018 film Ideal Home on his own experiences as a gay parent, helping to raise the son of his partner of 23 years.

Filmography

Films

Acting

Television

TV movies

Awards and nominations

References

External links

1963 births
American film directors
American male screenwriters
American television directors
American television producers
Comedy film directors
English-language film directors
Living people
Place of birth missing (living people)
American gay writers
LGBT film directors
LGBT television directors
American LGBT screenwriters
21st-century LGBT people